Adriano Giannini (born 10 May 1971) is an Italian actor and voice actor.

Biography
Giannini was born in Rome to actors Giancarlo Giannini and Livia Giampalmo. He began his career when he was 18 years old. 

His most notable role was alongside Madonna in the widely panned 2002 film Swept Away, a remake of the 1974 Italian film of the same name. Giannini played the same role that his father played in the original. 

His international roles include the voice of Rat in the 2003 animated film Sinbad: Legend of the Seven Seas. He had a leading role in the 2012 ABC television series Missing, starring Ashley Judd and Sean Bean.

As a voice dubber, Giannini dubbed the voices of both Heath Ledger and Joaquin Phoenix's portrayals of The Joker in the Italian releases of The Dark Knight and Joker respectively. He also provided the Italian voices of Christian Bale, Tom Hardy, Raz Degan, Benicio del Toro, Steven Strait and Laz Alonso in some of their work. In his animated roles, he dubbed Metro Man in Megamind and Mandrake in Epic.

Personal life
In 2019, Giannini married Trussardi creative director Gaia Trussardi after two years of dating. Giannini had an older brother, Lorenzo, who died from an aneurysm at the age of 21. He also has two younger half-brothers from his father's marriage to actress Eurilla del Bono.

Filmography

Cinema
 Off to the Revolution by a 2CV (2001)
 Swept Away (2002)
 Sinbad: Legend of the Seven Seas (2003) - Voice
 Stay with Me (2004)
 Ocean's Twelve (2004)  
 The Consequences of Love (2004) 
 Una talpa al bioparco (2004)
 Dolina (2007)
 Nero bifamiliare (2007)
 13 Roses (2007)
 Sandrine in the Rain (2008) 
 Butterflies & Lightning (2009)
 La casa sulle nuvole (2009)
 Baciami ancora (2010)
 Black Gold (2011)
 A Fairy-Tale Wedding (2014)
 A Woman as a Friend (2014)
 Without Pity (2014)
 The Ice Forest (2014)
 Ambo (2014)
 They Call Me Jeeg (2015)
 I Killed Napoléon (2015)
 Per amor vostro (2015)
 Magic Card (2015)
 Il colore nascosto delle cose (2017)
 Vivere (2019)
 The Ties (2020)
 Three Floors (2021)

Television
 Luisa Sanfelice (2004) - TV Film
 48 ore (2006)
 Tigri di carta (2008)
 L'isola dei segreti - Korè (2009)
 L'ombra del destino (2011)
 L'amore proibito (2011) - TV Film
 6 passi nel giallo (2012) - TV Film
 Missing (2012)  
 In Treatment (2013-2016)  
 The Cosmopolitans (2014)
 Limbo (2015)
 Boris Giuliano - Un poliziotto a Palermo (2016)
 Il coraggio di vincere (2017)
 Bang Bang Baby (2022)

Dubbing roles
Animation
Metro Man in MegamindMandrake in EpicJimmy Crystal in Sing 2Craniacs in ChalkZoneLive action
The Joker in The Dark KnightArthur Fleck / Joker in JokerFreddie Quell in The MasterJesus Christ in Mary MagdaleneDan in CandyRobbie Clark in I'm Not ThereForrest Bondurant in LawlessJohn Fitzgerald in The RevenantEddie Brock / Venom in VenomDicky Eklund in The FighterMoses in Exodus: Gods and KingsD'Leh in 10,000 BCCaptain Nero in Star TrekTsu'tey in AvatarHector Negron in Miracle at St. AnnaLemony Snicket in Lemony Snicket's A Series of Unfortunate EventsDJ in Star Wars: Episode VIII – The Last JediRust Cohle in True DetectiveWill Hayes in Definitely, MaybeHal Jordan / Green Lantern in Green LanternWestray in The CounselorThe Drover in AustraliaAnung Un Rama / Hellboy in HellboyYoung Karol Wojtyła in Pope John Paul IIDwight "Bucky" Bleichert in The Black DahliaJames Gregory in Goodbye BafanaRandy Lee James in Whatever WorksErnest Hemingway in Midnight in ParisCameron in Fathers and DaughtersTom "Taste" Felton / Tripplehorn in Date NightDean Moriarty in On the RoadSalvadore in Couples RetreatEnrique Goded in Bad EducationEdmond Burke's cellmate in EdmondAlceo in The Stone MerchantAmerican voice actors
 Carlos Alazraqui in Kiss Me Again''

References

External links

 
 
 

1971 births
Living people
Male actors from Rome
Italian male film actors
Italian male voice actors
Italian male television actors
21st-century Italian male actors
People of Ligurian descent